Manas National Park is a national park, UNESCO Natural World Heritage Site, Project Tiger reserve, biosphere reserve and an elephant reserve in Assam, India. Located in the Himalayan foothills, it is contiguous with Royal Manas National Park in Bhutan. The park is known for its rare and endangered endemic wildlife such as the Assam roofed turtle, hispid hare, golden langur and pygmy hog. Manas is famous for its population of the wild water buffalo.

Origin of the name
The name of the park is originated from the Manas River. The Manas river is a major tributary of Brahmaputra River, which passes through the heart of the national park.

History 
Manas bio reserve was created in 1973. Prior to the declaration of the sanctuary, it was a reserved forest called Manas R.F. and North Kamrup R.F. It was used by the Cooch Behar royal family and Raja of Gauripur as a hunting reserve. It was declared a World Heritage Site in December 1985 by UNESCO. Kahitama R.F. the Kokilabari R.F. and the Panbari R.F. were added in the year 1990 to form the Manas National Park. In 1992, UNESCO declared it as a world heritage site in danger due to heavy poaching and terrorist activities. On 21 June 2011, it was removed from the List of World Heritage in Danger and was commended for its efforts in preservation.

Human history
There is only one forest village, Pagrang, in the core of the national park. Apart from this village 56 more villages surround the park. Many more fringe villages are directly or indirectly dependent on the park.

Geography
Political Geography: The park area falls in the following districts: Chirang, Baksa in the autonomous territorial region, i.e BTR in the state of Assam in India.

The park is divided into three ranges.  The western range is based at Panbari, the central at Bansbari near Barpeta Road, and the eastern at Bhuiyapara near Pathsala. The ranges are not well connected; while two major rivers need to be forded in going from the centre to the Panbari, there is a rough trail (the Daimari road) connecting the centre to the eastern range.  Most visitors come to Bansbari and then spend some time inside the forest at Mathanguri on the Manas river at the Bhutan border.

Physical Geography: Manas is located in the foothills of the Eastern Himalaya and is densely forested. The Manas river flows through the west of the park and is the main river within it. It is a major tributary of Brahmaputra river and splits into two separate rivers, the Bwrsi and Bholkaduba as it reaches the plains. Five other smaller rivers also flow through the national park which lies on a wide, low-lying alluvial terrace spreading out below the foothills of the outer Himalaya. The Manas river also serves as an international border dividing India and Bhutan. The bedrock of the savanna area in the north of the park is made up of limestone and sandstone, whereas the grasslands in the south of the park stand on deep deposits of fine alluvium. The combination of Sub-Himalayan Bhabar Terai formation along with the riverine succession continuing up to Sub-Himalayan mountain forest makes it one of the richest areas of biodiversity in the world.

Heavy rainfall occurs between May and September.

Natural history

Biomes
There are two major biomes present in Manas:

 The grassland biomes : pygmy hog, Indian rhinoceros (re-introduced in 2007 after extinction due to heavy poaching during the Bodo uprising), bengal florican, wild Asian buffalo, etc.
 The forest biomes : slow loris, capped langur, wild pig, sambar, great hornbill, Malayan giant squirrel or black giant squirrel, Chinese pangolin etc.

Flora

Vegetation: The monsoon forests of Manas lie in the Brahmaputra Valley semi-evergreen forests ecoregion. The combination of Sub-Himalayan Bhabar Terai region with riverine succession leading up to the Himalayan subtropical broadleaf forests makes it one of the richest biodiversity areas in the world.

The main vegetation types are:

Sub-Himalayan light alluvial semi-evergreen forests in the northern parts.
East Himalayan mixed moist and dry deciduous forests (the most common type).
Low alluvial savanna woodland, and
Assam Valley semi-evergreen alluvial grasslands which cover almost 50% of the park.

Much of the riverine dry deciduous forest is at an early successional stage. It is replaced by moist deciduous forest away from water courses, which is succeeded by semi-evergreen climax forest in the northern part of the park. A total of 543 plants species have been recorded from the core zone. Of these, 374 species are dicotyledons (including 89 trees), 139 species monocotyledons and 30 are pteridophytes and gymnosperms.

The park's common trees include Aphanamixis polystachya, Anthocephalus chinensis, Syzygium cumini, Syzygium formosum, Syzygium oblatum, Bauhinia purpurea, Mallotus philippensis, Cinnamomum tamala, Actinodaphne obvata, Bombax ceiba, Sterculia villosa, Dillenia indica, Dillenia pentagyna, Careya arborea, Lagerstroemia parviflora, Lagerstroemia speciosa, Terminalia bellirica, Terminalia chebula, Trewia polycarpa, Gmelina arborea, Oroxylum indicum and Bridelia spp. The grasslands are dominated by Imperata cylindrica, Saccharum naranga, Phragmites karka, Arundo donax, Dillenia pentagyna, Phyllanthus emblica, Bombax ceiba, and species of Clerodendrum, Leea, Grewia, Premna and Mussaenda.

Fauna

The sanctuary has recorded 55 species of mammals, 380 species of birds, 50 of reptiles, and 3 species of amphibians. Out of these wildlife, 21 mammals are India's Schedule I mammals and 31 of them are threatened.

The fauna of the sanctuary include Indian elephants, Indian rhinoceros, gaurs, wild water buffaloes, barasingha, Indian tigers, Indian leopards, clouded leopards, Asian golden cats, jungle cat, leopard cat, fishing cat, marbled cat, Indian wolf, dholes, golden jackal, Bengal fox, capped langurs, golden langurs, Assamese macaques, rhesus macaque, gray langur, slow loris, hoolock gibbons, smooth-coated otters, sloth bears, nilgai, four-horned antelope, barking deer, hog deer, black panthers, sambar deer and chitals and large Indian civet, common palm civet, spotted Linsang, yellow-throated marten, black giant squirrel, Indian porcupine, Indian pangolin, Chinese pangolin, wild boar.

The park is well known for species of rare and endangered wildlife that are not found anywhere else in the world like the Assam roofed turtle, hispid hare, golden langur and pygmy hog.

The Manas hosts more than 450 species of birds. It has the largest population of the endangered Bengal florican to be found anywhere. Other major bird species include great hornbills, jungle fowls, bulbuls, brahminy ducks, kalij pheasants, egrets, pelicans, fishing eagles, crested serpent-eagles, falcons, scarlet minivets, bee-eaters, magpie robins, pied hornbills, grey hornbills, mergansers, harriers, Indian peafowl, ospreys and herons.

Gallery

See also
 Indian Council of Forestry Research and Education

References

External links
Wildlife Times: A trip to Kaziranga and Manas National Park
 Manas Maozigendri Ecotourism Society - Protectors of Manas
 
 Photo essay on the rhino translocations from Pobitora to Manas National Park

Brahmaputra Valley semi-evergreen forests
Tiger reserves of India
National parks in Assam
World Heritage Sites in India
Protected areas established in 1928
Tourism in Assam
1928 establishments in India